Logar Valley may refer to one of the following

Logar River valley, Afghanistan
Logar Valley (Slovenia), a valley in the Municipality of Solčava, northern Slovenia